The 1985 season was Newcastle Rosebud United's second season in the National Soccer League. Newcastle Rosebud United finished 12th in their National Soccer League season and were eliminated the NSL Cup semi-finals against Sydney Olympic.

Players

Competitions

Overview

National Soccer League

League table

Results summary

Results by round

Matches

NSL Cup

Statistics

Appearances and goals
Players with no appearances not included in the list.

Clean sheets

References

Adamstown Rosebud FC seasons